Sir William Harrington of Hornby (d. 1440), son of Sir Nicholas Harrington, was an early fifteenth-century English northern knight, fighting in the Hundred Years' War and serving the crown in the north of England.

War in France
He served Henry V while the latter was Prince of Wales, and in 1415 fought at the Battle of Agincourt as the king's standard-bearer. He was elected a knight of the Garter two years later, and, acting again as standard-bearer at the siege of Rouen in 1419, he was badly wounded.

Family
At some point he is known to have married Margaret Neville of Hornby, Lancashire. This was not, however the principal branch of the magnatial Neville family, and his new wife was not initially an heiress. However, through the death of her niece and great-nephew, she became a co-heiress with Sir John Langton of the family estates, and Harrington, jure uxoris, eventually gained Hornby Castle in 1433. His marriage also gave him a connection to the duke of Exeter, husband of Margaret's niece. Around 1420 he married his heir Thomas to his newly acquired ward, Elizabeth Dacre, which brought him in (dower) Dacre's castles of Heysham and Tatham. He died in 1440.

Royal service and offices
He was sheriff of Yorkshire four times from 1408, and was appointed to various royal offices in the duchy of Lancaster in Lancashire, including the important position of chief-steward of the north in 1428. In 1423, he had been part of a committee to negotiate with the Scots over the intended release of James I, who had been captured by the English on his way to France in 1408. Four years later, he led an embassy to James  in an attempt to make him pay the balance of his ransom.

References

Knights of the Garter
High Sheriffs of Yorkshire
1440 deaths
People of the Hundred Years' War